Castronia is a monotypic moth genus in the subfamily Arctiinae erected by E. Dukinfield Jones in 1912. Its only species, Castronia apostata, was first described by Schaus in 1905. It is found in Brazil.

References

External links

Lithosiini
Monotypic moth genera